The 2001 Asian Basketball Confederation Championship for Men was held in Shanghai, China.

Qualification

According to the ABC rules, each zone had two places, and the hosts (China) and the best 5 teams of the previous Asian Championship were automatically qualified.

Draw

Original draw:

* Withdrew

With DPR Korea and Saudi Arabia out of the championship, the ABC has called for a redraw of the 14 participants in Kuala Lumpur, Malaysia on July 12.

Preliminary round

Group A

Group B

Group C

Group D

Quarterfinal round

Group I

Group II

Group III

Group IV

Classification 5th–14th

13th place

11th place

9th place

7th place

5th place

Final round
Finalists qualified for the 2002 FIBA World Championship.

Semifinals

3rd place

Final

Final standing

Awards

Most Valuable Player:  Yao Ming
Best Playmaker:  Walid Doumiati
Best Rebounder:  Yao Ming
Best 3-Pointer:  Yang Kyun-Min
Best Coach:  Johnny Neumann (Lebanon) and  Wang Fei
Sportsmanship Award:  Michael Madanly

All-Star Team:

  Yao Ming
  Wang Zhizhi
  Fadi El Khatib
  Walid Doumiati
  Seo Jang-Hoon

References

External links
 Results
 archive.fiba.com
 jabba-net.com

ABC
2001
B
B
July 2001 sports events in Asia